Martin Geck (19 March 1936 – 22 November 2019) was a German musicologist. He taught at the Technical University of Dortmund. His publications concerned a number of major composers. Among the composers in whom he specialised was Johann Sebastian Bach.

Publications 
 Ludwig van Beethoven. Rowohlt Verlag, Reinbek bei Hamburg 1996, .
 ABC-Tierlieder zum Mitmachen. (with Gabriele Kulick and Irmgard Merkt), CD and Cassette, Cornelsen, Berlin 1997, .
 Musiktherapie als Problem der Gesellschaft. Klett-Cotta, Stuttgart 1998, .
 „Denn alles findet bei Bach statt“. Erforschtes und Erfahrenes. Metzler, Stuttgart/Weimar 2000, .
 Von Beethoven bis Mahler. Leben und Werk der großen Komponisten des 19. Jahrhunderts. Rowohlt, Reinbek bei Hamburg 2000, .
 Johann Sebastian Bach. Rowohlt, Reinbek bei Hamburg 2002, ; English translation 2006.
 Richard Wagner. Rowohlt, Reinbek bei Hamburg 2004, . Recension
 Mozart. Eine Biographie. Rowohlt, Reinbek bei Hamburg 2005, . Recension
 Wenn Papageno für Elise einen Feuervogel fängt. Kleine Geschichte der Musik. Rowohlt, Berlin 2006. Recension
 Wenn der Buckelwal in die Oper geht. 33 Variationen über die Wunder klassischer Musik. Siedler, Munich 2009. Recension
 Robert Schumann. Mensch und Musiker der Romantik. Siedler, Munich 2010, . Recension
 Richard Wagner. Biography. Siedler, Munich 2012, . Recension
 Johannes Brahms. Rowohlt, Reinbek bei Hamburg 2013, .
 Matthias Claudius. Biographie eines Unzeitgemäßen. Siedler, Munich 2014, . Recension
 Beethoven. Der Schöpfer und sein Universum. Siedler, Munich 2017, .

References

External links 
 
 
 Website von Martin Geck on TU Dortmund

1936 births
2019 deaths
People from Witten
German music educators
20th-century German musicologists
German writers about music
Bach scholars
Academic staff of the Technical University of Dortmund